The following is a list of winners in the 2008 MYX Music Awards, held at the Meralco Theater, Ortigas Center.

List of nominees and winners

Winners are in bold text

Favorite Music Video
 "Probinsyana" by Bamboo
 "Magbalik" by Callalily
 "Chicosci Vampire Social Club" by Chicosci
 "Sundo" by Imago
 "Tuliro" by Sponge Cola

Favorite Song
 "Magsasaya" by 6cyclemind
 "Chicosci Vampire Social Club" by Chicosci
 "Ikaw" by Sarah Geronimo
 "Ikaw Lamang" by Silent Sanctuary
 "Wag Ka Nang Umiyak" by Sugarfree

Favorite Artist
 6cyclemind
 Callalily
 Chicosci
 Sarah Geronimo
 Sponge Cola

Favorite Male Artist
 Christian Bautista
 Erik Santos
 Gloc-9
 Janno Gibbs
 Piolo Pascual

Favorite Female Artist
 Jaya
 Kyla
 Rachelle Ann Go
 Sarah Geronimo
 Toni Gonzaga

Favorite Group
 6cyclemind
 Bamboo
 Callalily
 Chicosci
 Sponge Cola

Favorite Collaboration
 "Pag-ibig Na Kaya" by Rachelle Ann Go & Christian Bautista
 "Lando" by Gloc9 & Francis M.
 "Salawikain" by Mcoy & The Spaceflower Show
 "Paano Kita Iibigin" by Regine Velasquez & Piolo Pascual
 "Inosente Lang Ang Nagtataka" by Rivermaya feat. Raimund Marasigan

Favorite Remake
 "Tatsulok " by Bamboo
 "Mahirap Magmahal Ng Syota Ng Iba" by Hilera
 "Is It Over" by Jaya
 "Love Will Lead You Back" by Kyla
 "Ale" by The Bloomfields

Favorite Rock Video
 "Tatsulok" by Bamboo
 "Chicosci Vampire Social Club" by Chicosci
 "Seksi Seksi" by Kamikazee
 "Will You Ever Learn" by Typecast
 "Guillotine" by Urbandub

Favorite Mellow Video
 "Is It Over" by Jaya
 "Love Will Lead You Back" by Kyla
 "Only Reminds Me Of You" by MYMP
 "Alam Ng Ating Mga Puso" by Rachelle Ann Go
 "Catch Me I'm Falling" by Toni Gonzaga

Favorite Urban Video
 "Summertime" by 7 Shots of Wisdom
 "Back Into You" by Amber Davis
 "Ikaw (Humanap Ka Ng Pangit Part 2)" by Andrew E.
 "Like That" by Billy Crawford
 "Lando" - Gloc9 & Francis M.

Favorite Indie Artist
 Ciudad
 Felepinas
 Kjwan
 Radioactive Sago Project
 Up Dharma Down

Favorite New Artist
 Julianne
 Lala
 Sam Concepcion
 Silent Sanctuary
 The Bloomfields

Favorite MYX Live Performance
 Gloc9
 Jed Madela
 Pupil
 Regine Velasquez & Piolo Pascual
 Sugarfree

Favorite International Music Video
 "Girlfriend" by Avril Lavigne
 "Teenagers" by My Chemical Romance
 "Your Guardian Angel" by The Red Jumpsuit Apparatus
 "Umbrella" by Rihanna
 "Jenny" by The Click Five

Favorite Media Soundtrack
 "Para Sa 'yo" by Aiza Seguerra (Ysabella)
 "Argos" by Bamboo (Rounin)
 "Sana Maulit Muli" by Gary Valenciano (Sana Maulit Muli)
 "Gotta Go My Own Way" by Nikki Gil (High School Musical 2)
 "Tuloy Pa Rin" by Sponge Cola (Pedro Penduko at ang mga Engkantao)

Favorite Guest Appearance in a Music Video
 Alfred Vargas ("All This Time" by Rufa Mae Quinto)
 Bella Flores ("Dear Kuya" by Sugarfree)
 Jake Cuenca & Roxanne Guinoo ("Haplos" by Shamrock)
 Kaye Abad ("Director's Cut" by Kamikazee)
 Kim Chiu & Gerald Anderson ("Love Team" by Itchyworms)

Favorite MYX Celebrity VJ
 Judy Ann Santos
 Kjwan
 Parokya Ni Edgar
 Rufa Mae Quinto
 Sarah Geronimo

Favorite MYX Bandarito Performance
 Bagetsafonik
 Duster
 Reklamo
 Quadro
 Zelle

Favorite Ringtone
"Catch Me I'm Falling" by Toni Gonzaga

MYX Magna Award
Gary Valenciano

References

Philippine music awards